Yotam Hanochi (born December 8, 2000) is an Israeli-Portugese professional basketball player for Ironi Kiryat Ata of the Israeli Basketball Premier League. He plays the small forward position.

His hometown is Afula, Israel. He is 6' 10" (208 cm) tall and weighs 218 lbs (99 kg).

He played for Team Israel in the 2017 FIBA U18 European Championship - Division B averaging 5.3 points and 3.5 rebounds per game, and in the 2019 FIBA U20 European Championship, averaging 8.1 points and 3.3 rebounds per game.

In 2020-21 he played for Hapoel Gilboa Galil and averaged 5.0 points and 2.7 rebounds per game. In 2021-22 he returned to the team, and averaged 6.0 points and 3.3 rebounds per game.

References

External links
basketball.realgm.com profile
FIBA Europe Cup profile
basket.co.il profile
EuroBasket profile
Balkan League profile

2000 births
Living people
Hapoel Gilboa Galil Elyon players
Ironi Kiryat Ata players
Israeli men's basketball players
People from Afula
Small forwards